Dwight Palmer Griswold (November 27, 1893April 12, 1954) was an American publisher and politician from the U.S. state of Nebraska.  He served as the 25th governor of Nebraska from 1941 to 1947, and in the United States Senate from 1952 until his death in 1954. Griswold was a member of the Republican Party.

Early life
Griswold was born in Harrison, Nebraska, and attended public schools in Gordon, Nebraska. He attended the Kearney Military Academy and Nebraska Wesleyan University. Griswold received a B.A. degree from the University of Nebraska in Lincoln in 1914.

Griswold served as an infantry sergeant on the U.S.–Mexico border from 1916 to 1917, and became a captain in field artillery during World War I.

Career
Griswold was the editor and publisher of the Gordon Journal in Gordon, Nebraska, from 1922 to 1940. He served in the Nebraska House of Representatives in 1920 and in the Nebraska Senate from 1925 to 1929. He was an unsuccessful candidate for governor in 1932, 1934, and 1936. He was elected governor in 1940 and reelected in 1942 and 1944. Griswold challenged Sen. Hugh A. Butler in the 1946 Republican primary, but was badly defeated.

Griswold served in the Military Government of Germany in 1947 and was chief of the American mission for aid to Greece from 1947 to 1948. He was elected to the United States Senate in 1952 to complete an unexpired term scheduled to end on January 3, 1955, but died on April 12, 1954, in the Bethesda Naval Hospital of a heart attack. Griswold was the third of six Senators to serve during the fifteenth Senate term for Nebraska's Class 2 seat, from January 3, 1949 to January 3, 1955. He is interred at Fairview Cemetery in Scottsbluff, Nebraska.

Griswold is a member of the Nebraska Hall of Fame.

References

Further reading
Nebraska Blue Book, 1954. (Lincoln, NE: Nebraska Legislative Council, 1954)
This biographical sketch is based largely on the entry in the Nebraska Blue Book, 1954.

External links

govtrack.us
Dwight Palmer Griswold entry at the National Governors Association

Dwight Palmer Griswold entry at The Political Graveyard

1893 births
1954 deaths
20th-century American politicians
20th-century American newspaper publishers (people)
American people of World War I
Republican Party governors of Nebraska
Republican Party members of the Nebraska House of Representatives
Military personnel from Nebraska
Republican Party United States senators from Nebraska
Republican Party Nebraska state senators
Nebraska Wesleyan University alumni
People from Sioux County, Nebraska
United States Army officers
University of Nebraska–Lincoln alumni